Winner of the All American Futurity and the All American Derby, Ronas Ryon  (born 1984) only finished off the board in a Quarter Horse race once in twenty-three starts, winning eighteen of his starts, and placing second in four.

Life

Ronas Ryon was a 1984 son of Windy Ryon, out of a daughter of Three Bargains. Three Bargains was a son of Three Bars (TB). Ronas Ryon second dam was a descendant of Wimpy P-1. He died in May 2000.

Racing career 
Ronas Ryon started twenty-three times on the Quarter tracks, winning eighteen times, coming in second four times. He only finished off the board once. He won the 1986 All American Futurity. He also won the All American Derby and over $1,700,000.00 in racing earnings.

Breeding record 
After retiring, Ronas Ryon went on to sire over a thousand foals, including an All American Derby winner in I Hear A Symphony.

Honors 
Ronas Ryon was inducted into the American Quarter Horse Association's (or AQHA) Hall of Fame in 2004.

Pedigree

Notes

References

 All Breed Pedigree Database Pedigree of Ronas Ryon retrieved on June 30, 2007
 AQHA Hall of Fame accessed on September 2, 2017
 
 History of the All American Futurity retrieved on July 5, 2007

External links
 Ronas Ryon at Quarter Horse Directory
 Ronas Ryon at Quarter Horse Legends

American Quarter Horse racehorses
American Quarter Horse sires
1984 racehorse births
AQHA Hall of Fame (horses)